Kochukadavu is a village in southern part of Thrissur district. Which is situated in Kuzhoor Grama Panjayath,  Under Mala Block Panjayath.

References 
 Kuzhoor Grama Panjayath election results 2005.
 Kochukadavu Pin - 680734

Thrissur district
Kerala